Hans Krebs (26 April 1888 – 15 February 1947) was an Ethnic German Nazi Party member and SS-Brigadeführer from Czechoslovakia.  Krebs was executed for war crimes by the Czechoslovak government in Prague in 1947.

Career
Krebs was born in the ancient town of Iglau (modern Jihlava) in Moravia when it was part of the Habsburg Empire. He was involved with German nationalism from his youth. In 1911 he became the manager of the German Workers' Party (Deutsche Arbeiterpartei) in Vienna. 

During World War I Krebs volunteered to serve in the Austro-Hungarian Army. He served in the South Tyrol, received several awards and was promoted to the rank of lieutenant. After the war, Krebs became involved with the German National Socialist Workers' Party (DNSAP) in the new Czechoslovakia and became the editor of the Iglauer Volkswehr newspaper. Iglau had become the second largest German-speaking enclave (Sprachinsel) inside Czechoslovakia and there was great political dissatisfaction among the Germans in Czechoslovakia.

Krebs was apparently in communication with Adolf Hitler, and was also a member of the Czech Parliament several times. In 1933 he was stripped of his parliamentary immunity and imprisoned. Krebs then fled to Nazi Germany, where he became a member of the Schutzstaffel (SS). He was soon promoted to the rank of SS-Brigadeführer. In the mid-1930s he wrote two books arguing the Sudeten German case: Kampf in Böhmen (Berlin, 1936); Wir Sudetendeutsche (Berlin, 1937).

Having become a nationalist early, he along with Rudolf Jung and Hans Knirsch, was one of the few original Moravian Nazis to remain in the party after 1933. During the Sudeten Crisis, Heinrich Himmler and the SS favoured Krebs over Konrad Henlein, and tried to play them off against one another to some degree. Krebs returned to Moravia in 1939 and participated in persecuting political opponents of the Nazi regime. He was appointed Oberregierungsrat im Reichsinnenministerium (Chief executive officer in the Reich Ministry of the Interior) and apparently had this job during World War II.

After the war Krebs was convicted of high treason, and executed by hanging by the Czechoslovak government in Prague in 1947.

Bibliography
Kampf in Böhmen, (Berlin: Volk und Reich Verlag, 1936)
Wir Sudetendeutsche, (Berlin:  Runge, 1937).

References
Karl Vietz, Ein Leben Für die Freiheit, in H. C. Kaergel, Ein Sudetendeutscher, p. 145
Lumans, Valdis O., Himmler’s Auxiliaries; The Volksdeutsche Mittelstelle and the German National Minorities of Europe, 1933–1945 – 1993.  /

External links
 

1888 births
1947 deaths
People from Jihlava
People from the Margraviate of Moravia
Moravian-German people
German Workers' Party (Austria-Hungary) politicians
German National Socialist Workers' Party (Czechoslovakia) politicians
Nazi Party politicians
Members of the Chamber of Deputies of Czechoslovakia (1929–1935)
Members of the Reichstag of Nazi Germany
SS-Brigadeführer
Austro-Hungarian military personnel of World War I
Nazis executed by Czechoslovakia by hanging
People executed for treason against Czechoslovakia